Pope Innocent VIII (r. 1484–1492) created eight new cardinals in one consistory on 9 March 1489, although the names of two of them were  published only after his death:

 Lorenzo Cybo de Mari, nephew of the Pope and archbishop of Benevento – cardinal priest of S. Susanna (received the title on 23 March 1489), then cardinal priest of S. Cecilia (1490), cardinal-priest of S. Marco (1496), cardinal bishop of Albano (14 May 1501) and cardinal bishop of Palestrina (29 November 1503), † 21 December 1503
 Ardicino della Porta, bishop of Aleria and papal secretary – cardinal priest of SS. Giovanni e Paolo (received the title on 23 March 1489), † 4 February 1493
 Antonio Pallavicini Gentili, papal datary and bishop of Orense – cardinal priest of S. Anastasia (received the title on 23 March 1489), then cardinal priest of S. Prassede (31 August 1492), cardinal bishop of Tusculum (10 April 1503), cardinal bishop of Palestrina (22 December 1503), † 10 September 1507
 André d'Espinay, archbishop of Bordeaux – cardinal priest of SS. Silvestro e Martino (received the title on 23 March 1489), † 10 November 1500
 Pierre d'Aubusson, O.S.Io.Hieros., Grand Master of his Order on Rodos – cardinal deacon of S. Adriano (received the title on 23 March 1489), † 3 July 1503
 Giovanni de' Medici, protonotary apostolic, son of Lorenzo de Medici (in pectore, published on 26 March 1492) – cardinal deacon of S. Maria in Domnica, on 11 March 1513 became Pope Leo X, † 1 December 1521
 Federico di Sanseverino, protonotary apostolic (in pectore, published on 26 July 1492, after the death of the Pope) – cardinal deacon of S. Teodoro (received the title in 1492), then cardinal deacon of S. Angelo (17 March 1511); deposed and excommunicated on 24 October 1511, reinstated as cardinal deacon of S. Angelo on 27 June 1513, † 7 August 1516
 Maffeo Gherardi, O.S.B.Cam., patriarch of Venice (in pectore, published on 3 August 1492, after the death of the Pope) – cardinal priest of SS. Sergio e Bacco (received the title in 1492), † 14 September 1492

References

Sources

 Konrad Eubel: Hierarchia Catholica, vol. II i III, Münster 1914-1922

Innocent 8
College of Cardinals
15th-century Catholicism